The 2016 PDC Pro Tour was a series of non-televised darts tournaments organised by the Professional Darts Corporation (PDC). Players Championships, UK Open Qualifiers and European Tour events are the events that make up the Pro Tour. In 2016 there were 36 PDC Pro Tour events held – 20 Players Championships, six UK Open Qualifiers and ten European Tour events.

Prize money
Prize money for each Players Championship increased from £60,000 to £75,000 per event. The UK Open Qualifiers and European Tour events stayed the same as in 2015.

This is how the prize money is divided:

PDC Tour Cards
128 players are granted Tour Cards, which enables them to participate in all Players Championships, UK Open Qualifiers and European Tour events.

Tour Cards
The 2016 Tour Cards are awarded to:
(63) The top 64 players from the PDC Order of Merit after the 2016 World Championship.
  resigned his card.
(27) The 27 of 34 qualifiers from 2015 Q-School not ranked in the top 64 of the PDC Order of Merit following the World Championship.
  resigned his card.
(2) Two highest qualifiers from 2015 Challenge Tour ( and ). 
(2) Two highest qualifiers from 2015 Development Tour ( and ).
 (2) Two highest qualifiers from 2014 Challenge Tour ( and ).
 (1) Two highest qualifiers from 2014 Development Tour ( and ).
 Dimitri Van den Bergh is also in the top 64 of the PDC Order of Merit, and therefore, one extra Tour Card was awarded to a Q-School qualifier.
 (1) The winner of the 2015 Scandinavian Order of Merit.
 (16) The 16 qualifiers from 2016 Q-School.
Afterwards, the playing field was complemented by the highest qualified players from the Q School Order of Merit until the maximum number of 128 Pro Tour Card players had been reached. In 2016, that meant a total of 14 players qualified this way.

Q-School
The PDC Pro Tour Qualifying School took place at the Robin Park Tennis Centre in Wigan from January 13–16. The following players won two-year tour cards on each of the days played:

A Q School Order of Merit was also created by using the following points system:

To complete the field of 128 Tour Card Holders, places were allocated down the final Qualifying School Order of Merit. The following players picked up Tour Cards as a result:

UK Open Qualifiers
Six qualifiers took place to determine seedings for the 2016 UK Open.

Players Championships
There were 20 Players Championship events. In addition, the top 64 of the Players Championship will qualify for the Players Championship Finals.

European Tour
Compared to 2015, there's one European Tour event added on the calendar. In addition, the top 32 of the European Tour will qualify for the European Championship.

PDC Challenge Tour
The PDC Unicorn Challenge Tour was open to all PDPA Associate Members who failed to win a Tour Card at Qualifying School. The players who finished first and second received two-year Tour Cards to move onto the PDC Pro Tour in 2017 and 2018. In addition, the players who finished from third to eighth will receive free entry to the 2017 PDC Q-School.

PDC Development Tour
The PDC Unicorn Development Tour is open to players aged 16–23. The Development Tour is expanded from 16 to 20 tournaments, where event number 20 is the PDC Youth World Championship from the Last 64 onwards. The players who finish first and second on the Order of Merit will receive two-year Tour Cards to move onto the PDC Pro Tour in 2017 and 2018. In addition, the players who finish from third to eighth will receive free entry to the 2017 PDC Q-School.

Scandinavian Darts Corporation Pro Tour
The Scandinavian Pro Tour had eight events in 2016, with a total of €40,000 on offer. The top player and the runner-up on the SDC Order of Merit 2016 will play in the 2017 World Championship preliminary round.

Leading the overall table, Kim Viljanen and Magnus Caris won their places in the 2017 World Championship.

EuroAsian Darts Corporation (EADC) Pro Tour
The 6 EADC Pro Tour events and the 2017 World Championship Qualifier were played at Omega Plaza Business Center, Moscow. Players from Armenia, Azerbaijan, Belarus, Georgia, Kazakhstan, Kyrgyzstan, Moldova, Russia, Tajikistan, Turkmenistan, Uzbekistan and Ukraine are eligible to play.

Australian Grand Prix Pro Tour
The Australian Grand Prix rankings are calculated from events across Australia. The top player in the rankings automatically qualified for the 2017 World Championship.

Corey Cadby secured top spot in the Australian Grand Prix rankings and will qualify for the 2017 World Championship. David Platt also won a place in the 2017 World Championship by winning the Oceanic Masters and therefore he will join Cadby and DPNZ qualifier Warren Parry to compete in the World Championship.

Chinese Tour
Stages One to Three will count towards the 2016 PDC World Cup of Darts, Stages Four to Seven for the inaugural 2016 Shanghai Darts Masters event and Stage Eight was a qualifier for the 2016 PDC World Youth Championship. Stage Thirteen was for the 2017 PDC World Darts Championship Qualification (see below at International Qualifiers).

World Championship PDPA Qualifier
The winner directly qualified for the first round, whereelse the runner-up and the two losers of the semi-finals entered the 2017 PDC World Darts Championship in the preliminary round.

World Championship International Qualifiers

References

 
PDC Pro Tour
2016 in darts